Danny Hale (born December 29, 1946) is a former American football player and coach.  He served as head football coach at Bloomsburg University of Pennsylvania for 20 seasons from 1993 to 2012. Hale was previously head coach at West Chester University of Pennsylvania from 1984 to 1988.

Head coaching record

See also
 List of college football coaches with 200 wins

References

External links
 Bloomsburg profile

1946 births
Living people
Bloomsburg Huskies football coaches
Bucknell Bison football coaches
Colgate Raiders football coaches
Vermont Catamounts football coaches
West Chester Golden Rams football coaches
West Chester Golden Rams football players